The Boston mayoral election of 1949 occurred on Tuesday, November 8, 1949, between incumbent Mayor of Boston James Michael Curley, city clerk and former acting mayor John B. Hynes, and three other candidates. Hynes was elected to his first term.

Boston voters also approved changing the structure of future mayoral contests to include a preliminary election, to select two final candidates in advance of each general election. It also shifted the years in which elections would he held. The first such election was set for 1951, meaning that Hynes would only serve a two-year term, rather than a four-year term.

Hynes was inaugurated on Monday, January 2, 1950.

Candidates
James Michael Curley, Mayor of Boston from 1914 to 1918, 1922 to 1926, 1930 to 1934, and since 1946. Member of the United States House of Representatives from 1913 to 1914 and from 1943 to 1947. Governor of Massachusetts from 1935 to 1937. Member of the Massachusetts House of Representatives from 1902 to 1903.
John B. Hynes, Boston City Clerk since 1946, Acting Mayor in 1947.
Patrick J. McDonough, Member of the Massachusetts Governor's Council since 1947, member of the Massachusetts House of Representatives from 1941 to 1947.
Walter A. O'Brien, Progressive Party politician. Commissioned M.T.A. as a campaign song.
George F. Oakes, real estate businessman and former chairman of the Plan E for Boston Committee.

Results

See also
List of mayors of Boston, Massachusetts

References

Further reading
 

Boston mayoral
Boston
1949
Non-partisan elections
Mayoral election, 1949
Boston mayoral election